Astuvere is a village in Elva Parish, Valga County in southeastern Estonia. Astuvere has a population of 22 (as of 31 December 2011).

The Tartu–Valga railway passes Astuvere, but there's no station. The nearest station is located in the neighbouring Palupera village about 3 km north.

References

Villages in Valga County